The 2021–22 season is the 97th season of competitive football in Poland.

Men's football

League competitions

Ekstraklasa

I liga

II liga

III liga

Cup competitions

Polish Cup

Polish SuperCup

UEFA competitions

UEFA Champions League

Qualifying phase and play-off round

First qualifying round

|}

Second qualifying round

|}

Third qualifying round

|}

UEFA Europa League

Qualifying phase and play-off round

Play-off round

|}

Group stage

Group C

UEFA Europa Conference League

Qualifying phase and play-off round

First qualifying round

|}

Second qualifying round

|}

Third qualifying round

|}

Play-off round

|}

UEFA Youth League

Domestic Champions Path

First round

|}

UEFA Women's Champions League

Qualifying rounds

Round 1

National team

Poland national football team

Friendlies

2022 FIFA World Cup qualification

Group I

Second round

Path B

Poland national under-21 football team

Friendlies

2023 UEFA European Under-21 Championship

Qualification

Group B

Poland women's national football team

2023 FIFA Women's World Cup qualification

Group F

Notes

References

 
Football
Football
Poland
Poland